Prometheus is a name used by multiple supervillains appearing in comic books published by DC Comics. Created by writer Grant Morrison and penciller Arnie Jorgensen, the most recognized version first appeared in New Year's Evil: Prometheus (February 1998). Commonly an adversary of the Justice League and a villainous foil personality to Batman (similar to villains Killer Moth, Wrath, and Hush), Prometheus would serve as an enemy to superheroes including Batman, Green Arrow and Midnighter.

In 2009, Prometheus was ranked as IGN's 80th Greatest Comic Book Villain of All Time. On The CW's live-action Arrowverse TV series Arrow, the character was portrayed by Josh Segarra and voiced by Michael Dorn.

Publication history 
Curt Calhoun debuted in Blue Beetle (vol. 6) #3 (August 1986). A new version of Prometheus debuted in New Year's Evil: Prometheus (February 1998) and returned in JLA #16–17 (March–April 1998) and #36–41 (December 1999–May 2000). The character was then impersonated for a time by Chad Graham, but returned in Faces of Evil: Prometheus #1 (March 2009). Prometheus starred as the villain in the limited series Justice League: Cry for Justice #1–7 (September 2009–April 2010), and was killed at the conclusion of the story.

Writer Mike Conroy noted "...with his technologically advanced armor and weapons arsenal, which can download the fighting techniques of the world's top martial artists...he (Prometheus) turned out to be a formidable foe, as the JLA found out".

Fictional character biography

Curt Calhoun 
The original version, Curt Calhoun, debuted in Blue Beetle (vol. 6) #3 (August 1986), followed by appearances in issues #4 (September 1986); #6 (November 1986); #8–9 (January–February 1987) and #11–13 (April–June 1987). Calhoun is a small-time criminal working for supervillain Doctor Alchemy and is hired to steal a quantity of the metal promethium from KORD Inc., an organization owned by Ted Kord. Although successful, both Calhoun and Dr. Alchemy are captured by the Blue Beetle. On release from prison, Calhoun aids the Blue Beetle against the Calculator and is offered a position as a foreman at KORD Inc. by Kord. While saving Kord from an industrial accident, Calhoun is covered with metals laced with promethium. En route to the hospital, Calhoun's ambulance is attacked by members of the supervillain team known as Hybrid. The leader, Mento, transforms the metal covering Calhoun into a permanent metallic shell. Assuming the "Prometheus" alias, the reluctant Calhoun fights alongside Hybrid in an unsuccessful attempt to defeat the New Teen Titans. Although Mento eventually directs Hybrid against the Titans once again, they rebel and Mento is apparently cured of his insanity by Titan member Raven. Calhoun is never seen again, until the superhero JSA team learns that Hybrid died in the gladiatorial games staged by villainess Roulette. The original version possesses a metal epidermis, which confers superior strength and durability. Calhoun is also capable of raising the temperature of his armored form to several hundred degrees Celsius.

Unnamed version 
The most well-known version is the unnamed son of two hippie spree killers, who traveled across the United States with them until they were cornered by local law enforcement and were gunned down after opening fire on the surrounding police. This traumatic experience causes his hair to turn white, and he vows to "annihilate the forces of justice" to get revenge for his slain parents.

Using his parents' hidden caches of money, the son travels the world and develops his skills, becoming an underground pit-fighter in Brazil and a mercenary in Africa, and joining terrorist groups in the Middle East. After avenging his parents' deaths by murdering the police officer who shot them, he locates the Himalayan city of Shambhala, inhabited by a sect of monks that worshiped the concept of evil. Prometheus discovers the monastery has been built on an alien spaceship, and the leader of the sect is one of the creatures from the vessel. He kills the alien and obtains the "Ghost Key", which opens a portal to the "Ghost Zone".

Prometheus builds a house in the void as his headquarters, which is warped by the dimensional effects to become "crooked". He relates his origin to a young man, with the alias "Retro", who has won a competition to be part of the JLA for a day. Prometheus kills Retro, copies the young man's mannerisms (courtesy of his advanced helmet), and joins the tour group at the JLA transporters, intending to masquerade as Retro to gain access to the JLA Watchtower.

Initially, the plan appears to be successful, with Prometheus infecting Steel's armor with a virus, hitting the Martian Manhunter with a dart containing a toxin that destabilizes his ability to control his shape, knocking out Huntress, trapping Zauriel in the Ghost Zone, beating Batman senseless using downloaded skills, using neural chaff to disrupt Green Lantern's will, and informing Flash that the tower is rigged with bombs that will detonate if he moves too fast. He then tries to force Superman to kill himself so that Prometheus will allow civilians to leave, on the grounds that Superman was too powerful for him to devise a means of killing. Prometheus is then caught off guard by the anti-hero Catwoman, who had also infiltrated the tour group, allowing the heroes time to recover. Steel infects Prometheus's systems with a virus. Admitting he lied about the bombs, Prometheus escapes to the Ghost Zone before he can be captured.

Prometheus appears briefly during an encounter between the JLA and the Avengers and skirmishes with Captain America while using Batman's skills, but Captain America easily defeats him.

Prometheus returns as a member of Lex Luthor's second Injustice Gang. During the confusion caused by the arrival of the weapon Mageddon, Prometheus is able to use a White Martian space vessel abandoned in the Ghost Zone to infiltrate the Watchtower and attack Oracle. Oracle escapes, with Prometheus's helmet being damaged in the process. The villain retrieves his original helmet (lost during the first battle with the JLA) and battles Batman once again. Prometheus is neutralized when Batman sabotages his helmet, overriding the information on the disc Prometheus uses to upload his combat skills and replacing the data with the physical skills and coordination of Professor Stephen Hawking. Batman prevents fellow member Huntress from killing Prometheus. Batman and Martian Manhunter take Prometheus into custody and arrange to reduce Prometheus's brain to a mentally disabled state to permanently end his threat, reasoning that his skills and training mean that no jail could hold him under conventional circumstances. Upon Martian Manhunter's death at Libra's hands, Prometheus's mind was restored and he tracked down Chad Graham, killing his would-be protégé and maiming/murdering members of the Blood Pack super-hero team.

Cry for Justice 
A spate of superhero deaths (Freedom Beast, Gloss, and Tasmanian Devil) and attacks on others (Barry Allen, Batwoman, and Crimson Avenger) is revealed to be the work of the true Prometheus. The villain impersonates Freddy Freeman and gains access to the JLA satellite, which in turn allows Prometheus to place teleportation devices in the home cities of various heroes which will "strand" them in various places in the past and future, as revenge for the years that he spent with his mind damaged. Prometheus also maims Roy Harper after Harper realizes his foe is not Freddy Freeman. After defeating the JLA and the Teen Titans by reading files on them, Prometheus is captured by Donna Troy and beaten brutally, until being stopped by the Shade. Prometheus offers to reveal the location of the devices in exchange for his release, after they malfunction and begin destroying the cities. With Star City suffering massive casualties (including Roy's daughter), Prometheus's ultimatum is met and he returns to his lair, but is murdered by Green Arrow by shooting an arrow through his head.

The New 52 
Prometheus shows up to torment Midnighter using stolen technology from the God Garden that he sells to various individuals around the world. In addition, he acquires the Gardener's secret files on Midnighter's true identity and origin. When confronted by Midnighter, Prometheus uses God Garden technology to block Midnighter's tactical computer, eliminating the edge Midnighter has in analyzing an opponent's fighting techniques. Prometheus also reveals that he has downloaded all of Midnighter's own skills into his brain to use against his enemy.

Pretending to be an ordinary man, he uses the alias Matt Dell to seduce and have a romantic relationship with Midnighter to achieve his goals.

Chad Graham 
The third version, Chad Graham, debuted in Batman: Gotham Knights #52 (June 2004), as part of the "Pushback" storyline from issues #50–55 (April–September 2004). The villain reappeared in Batman: Gotham Knights #66 (August 2005); Villains United #1–6 (July–September 2005); Infinite Crisis #1–7 (December 2005–June 2006); Birds of Prey #94 (June–August 2006); Teen Titans (vol. 3) #51–54 (November 2007–February 2008) and Final Crisis #1–7 (July 2008–March 2009). He was not initially established as a different version from the second version until the "Faces of Evil" issue that featured the second version's return. It was later revealed that his former apprentice assumed the Prometheus identity after the well-known version went into a mentally disabled state; Graham had been taken in by Prometheus to serve as an evil sidekick years earlier, but proved too impulsive and ended up leaving Prometheus (under unknown circumstances). Graham appears in Star City, battling Green Arrow and local law enforcement. Almost killed by Green Arrow, Graham is saved by Hush. Hush forms an alliance with the impostor but abandons him due to his incompetence. Talia al Ghul leads Kobra in search of Prometheus in a bid to secure his Ghost Key. Graham, poisoned by Poison Ivy, is saved once again by Hush. Graham is then recruited to join another version of the Secret Society of Super Villains and participates in a massive attack by the Society on Metropolis. During the battle, Graham kills Peacemaker. Graham also has an encounter with the Birds of Prey and defeats Lady Shiva in seconds. He eventually falls under the alien Starro's control but is freed once Starro is defeated. Graham is later murdered when the true Prometheus regains himself; he expresses contempt for Graham's impersonation but is satisfied that the damage Graham has done to Prometheus's reputation would lead to the heroes underestimating him in the future. The third version relies on the use of two pistols, although he also possesses his mentor's helmet and artificial skills, giving him the training to defeat even Lady Shiva in a matter of seconds.

Powers and abilities 
Prometheus possesses no superhuman abilities, but has undergone intense physical and mental training and utilizes an extensive range of equipment and technology like the hero Batman. Common tools include body armor, gauntlets that fire various projectiles, a side-handle baton with several technological features, and a helmet that in addition to emitting strobe lighting capable of disorientation and hypnotism, can download the knowledge and physical skills of others directly into his brain via a compact disc, his default disc including the skills of thirty of the world's greatest martial artists. Where Prometheus obtains this information is not known, but his combat skills include the duplicated abilities of Batman and Lady Shiva, although it is unclear how much combat training he would possess if he had to fight without the helmet. The 'battlesuit'/helmet combination is also equipped with an artificial Intelligence that can rapidly calculate and deploy a variety of strategies and countermeasures that have allowed Prometheus at various times to incapacitate entire groups of the Justice League singlehandedly and simultaneously.

Finally, the unnamed version possesses the "Ghost Key" which allows the villain to teleport himself and other objects and persons to and from a dimension called the "Ghost Zone". It can also be used to inflict total molecular disintegration on a target, but Prometheus only employed this function once, when he eliminated the unsuspecting Retro. The helmet can be hacked by external sources, but Batman had to study the helmet for a month to learn how to hack it in that manner, and it is unclear if this would allow him to hack other versions of the helmet.

Other versions

JLA/Avengers 
In JLA/Avengers, Prometheus is seen among the enthralled villains defending Krona's stronghold in issue #4. He is seen being seized by Green Lantern. Later, he confronts Captain America, having downloaded Batman's fighting skills. However, using his shield, Captain America defeats Prometheus.

Prometheus and his men arrive at Fort Knox via Boom Tube, intending to steal the gold that is kept there, but Green Arrow is waiting for them, with help from Zatanna. After taking out his men, a one-on-one battle ensues between Arrow and Prometheus. Prometheus wonders if Green Arrow cares about his real identity but Oliver says that if he is not his counterpart from a parallel Earth he does not really care about it. During the fight, Oliver succeeds to get the upper hand and start beating Prometheus, raging over what he had done to Agent Chase's team and the fact that he almost took him away from his child, finishing him off with a massive headbutt.

Power Rangers/Justice League 
When Lord Zedd and Brainiac form an alliance to steal the Power Rangers' Power Coins and attack their world, the League permit the Rangers to access their archives to provide them with equipment and resources to battle their enemies' forces until they can regain their powers, with Billy Cranston using Prometheus's helmet and armor.

In other media

Television 

Two variations of Prometheus appear in live-action media set in the Arrowverse, with Michael Dorn providing his disguised voice:  
 The Earth-1 version appears in season five of Arrow, portrayed by Josh Segarra. This version is introduced as the media-dubbed "Throwing Star Killer" who targets seemingly random victims and attracts Green Arrow's attention. It is later revealed that Prometheus is Adrian Chase / Simon Morrison.
 An alternate universe version appears in the crossover "Crisis on Earth-X" as the Earth-X doppelgänger of Tommy Merlyn (portrayed by Colin Donnell).

Video games 
 The unnamed incarnation of Prometheus appears in the Game Boy Advance and Nintendo DS versions of Justice League Heroes.
 A biography for the unnamed incarnation of Prometheus appears in Batman Arkham Asylum.
 Simon Morrison / Prometheus appears as a playable character in the "DC TV Super-Villains" DLC pack for Lego DC Super-Villains.

Miscellaneous
Prometheus appears in Smallville: Lantern. After stealing equipment from the Department of Extranormal Operations (DEO), he fights the Green Arrow and a DEO team before disappearing in a Boom Tube.

References

External links 

Prometheus (Curt Calhoun)  at the DCU Guide
Prometheus (Morrison)  at the DCU Guide

Batman characters
Characters created by Grant Morrison
Characters created by Len Wein
Comics characters introduced in 1986
Comics characters introduced in 1998
DC Comics characters with superhuman strength
DC Comics LGBT supervillains
DC Comics male supervillains
DC Comics martial artists
DC Comics orphans
Fictional archers
Fictional assassins in comics
Fictional mass murderers
Fictional Pencak Silat practitioners
Fictional uxoricides
Prometheus
Supervillains with their own comic book titles

de:Schurken im Superman-Universum#Prometheus